Astros is the second studio album by Colombian singer-songwriter Anasol, released on 21 June 2002 by Sony Music Colombia.

Track listing

References

2002 albums
Sony Music Colombia albums
Anasol albums